Kye Song-hyok (born 12 November 1992) is a North Korean professional footballer who plays as a forward.

International goals
Scores and results are list North Korea's goal tally first.

External links 
 

1992 births
Living people
North Korean footballers
North Korea international footballers
Association football forwards
2015 AFC Asian Cup players